Thermoase may refer to:
 Subtilisin, an enzyme
 Thermolysin, an enzyme